Prishib is the name of several rural localities in Russia.

Modern localities
Prishib, Astrakhan Oblast, a selo in Prishibinsky Selsoviet of Yenotayevsky District in Astrakhan Oblast; 
Prishib, Republic of Bashkortostan, a selo in Alexeyevsky Selsoviet of Blagovarsky District in the Republic of Bashkortostan
Prishib, Omsk Oblast, a selo in Prishibsky Rural Okrug of Azovsky Nemetsky National District in Omsk Oblast
Prishib, Rostov Oblast, a khutor in Voznesenskoye Rural Settlement of Morozovsky District in Rostov Oblast
Prishib, Voronezh Oblast, a selo in Krasnobratskoye Rural Settlement of Kalacheyevsky District in Voronezh Oblast

Renamed localities
Prishib, name of Leninsk, a town in Leninsky District of Volgograd Oblast, until 1919